Evolution/Revolution: The Early Years (1966–1974) is a two-CD compilation of live stand-up comedy recordings by comedian and actor Richard Pryor, that predates his 1974 mainstream breakthrough album That Nigger's Crazy.

The album was primarily compiled from tapes recorded by Laff Records between 1966 and 1974.  By 1968, Pryor had only recorded and released one album up to that point, the eponymous debut that was released by Dove/Reprise and featured a much milder Pryor.

Background
In 1970 Pryor signed with Laff Records to record and release his second album, the underground classic Craps (After Hours).  After its release in February 1971, Pryor sought out a larger label for his next album but didn't find it until 1974 when he signed with Stax Records, who originally released That Nigger's Crazy.  Laff promptly sued Pryor, but a settlement allowed Pryor to become a free agent in exchange for allowing Laff to release all previously unissued material with them.   After Pryor signed with Warner Bros. Records in 1975, where he kicked his recording career into high gear with the release of ...Is It Something I Said? and the reissue of That Nigger's Crazy, Laff began rushing out badly packaged and mastered albums to piggyback Pryor's Warner Bros. releases.

Between 1971 and 1983, Laff released twelve albums worth of Pryor material, but spread out the contents amongst twenty different albums, including releases that either repackaged older albums with new titles and covers, or albums that paired Pryor tracks from Craps with previously issued material from other comedians who had recorded for Laff (including Redd Foxx).

In 2002, Pryor and his wife/manager Jennifer Lee Pryor won the legal rights all of the Laff material with Pryor's name on it—over 40 hours of unedited reel-to-reel tapes—containing recordings both issued and unissued.  Jennifer Lee Pryor then gave Reggie Collins and Steve Pokorny, the men who had previously compiled the ...And It's Deep Too! The Complete Warner Bros. Recordings (1968–1992) nine-CD box set and its companion 2-CD Anthology for Rhino, access to all of the tapes.

Disc 1 contains what is said to be the best of the material Laff had released on record after 1974, while Disc 2 contains the entire Craps album plus other unreleased material, including the unedited version of Pryor's entire Wattstax monologue.

The album packaging also contains liner notes from journalist David Felton, who had interviewed Pryor several times, including around the time of That Nigger's Crazy'''s release and after Pryor had his 1980 free-basing accident.

Track listing

Disc One: Evolution (1966–1968)
"Peoria"
"Improv, Pt. 1"
"Heart & Brain"
"Taxi Cabs & Subways"
"Playboy Club"
"Rumpelstiltskin"
"Slippin' In Poo Poo"
"Birth Control"
"Nigger Babies"
"Faith Healer"
"Black Power"
"I Feel"
"Jail"
"Prison Play" (aka Black Ben The Blacksmith)
"Directions"
"Movie Stars In The Bathroom"
"War Movies"
"The Army"
"Hippy Dippys"
"Hank's Place"
"Improv, Pt. 2"
"Mankind"

Recording Details
Disc One recorded live at:
The Hungry I, San Francisco, CA, February 1966 (Tracks 1, 2)
unknown venue, July 15, 1967 (Tracks 4, 5)
P.J.'s, Hollywood, CA, May 24 & 25, 1968 (Tracks 7–11)
The Troubador, West Hollywood, April 1968 (Tracks 14, 15, 21, 22) and July 26–29, 1968 (remainder)

Disc Two: Revolution (1971–1974)
Prelude
Gettin' High
Fuck From Memory
Big Tits
Gettin' Some
The President
Asshole
The Line-Up
Masturbating
Religion
Black Preachers
Being Born
Blow Our Image
Blackjack
I Spy Cops
Sugar Ray
White Folks
Indians
Ass Wupin'
Got A Dollar
Pres' Black Baby
Doope
Wino Panthers
After Hours
280 Pound Ass
Crap Game
Insurance Man
Black And Proud
Gettin' The Nut
Fuck The Faggot
Jackin' Off
Snappin' Pussy
Fartin'
Wattstax Monologue: 
Niggers
The Handshake
Rummage Sale/Stylin'
Whitey
"Justifiable Homicide"
Super Nigger
Marijawani
Whorehouse, Pt. 1
Whorehouse, Pt. 2
Niggers & Italians
Jim Brown (alternate version)
Black Films
Jesus Saves
Street Corner Wino ("Wino & Junkie" intro)
Wino & Junkie
Interview

Recording Details
Disc Two recorded live at:
The Redd Foxx Club, Hollywood, CA, January 1971 (Tracks 2-33—the entire Craps (After Hours) album)
Laney College, Oakland, CA, February 25, 1971 (Track 35)
Basin Street West, San Francisco, CA, February 26, 1971 (Tracks 36, 42)
unknown venue, Los Angeles, CA, May 30, 1971 (Track 1)
The Summit Club, Hollywood, CA, October 8, 1972, for use in the motion picture Wattstax (Track 34)
The Comedy Store, Hollywood, CA, October 29-November 1, 1973 (Tracks 37–41)
unknown location in San Francisco Bay Area, Fall 1974 (Track 43)

Primary Recording Credits
Known Original Producers: Richard Pryor, Robert Marchese & David Drozen
Executive Producer (Craps (After Hours)''): Louis Drozen
Known Original Engineers: Ron Johnson, Gabby Garcia, Chris Chigaridas
Compilation Produced By: Reggie Collins and Steve Pokorny
Supervising Producer: Jennifer Lee Pryor
Executive Producer: Richard Pryor

References

External links
Richard Pryor's Official Homepage
Rhino Records page on Evolution/Revolution album

Richard Pryor compilation albums
2005 live albums
Rhino Records live albums
Rhino Records compilation albums